Vendôme is a Michelin 3-star restaurant in Bergisch Gladbach, near Cologne, Germany. The restaurant is led by chef de cuisine , and is part of the Grandhotel Schloss Bensberg.

Under Wissler, Vendôme received its first Michelin star in 2001, a second in 2002 and finally the third in 2005, an award only given to "exceptional cuisine with distinctive dishes, precisely executed using superlative ingredients, and worth a special journey". Vendôme has consistently been ranked among The World's 50 Best Restaurants since 2008. It was voted 47th best in the world on Restaurant magazine's 2017 list, the highest ranked German restaurant of two on the list, the other being Tim Raue's restaurant currently ranked at number 48.

See also 
 List of Michelin 3-star restaurants

References

External links 
 

Restaurants in Germany
Michelin Guide starred restaurants in Germany
Bergisch Gladbach